Manordeilo and Salem is a community located in Carmarthenshire, Wales. The population taken at the 2011 census was 1,754.

The community is bordered by the communities of: Talley; Llansadwrn; Llangadog; Dyffryn Cennen; Llandeilo; Llangathen; and Llanfynydd, all being in Carmarthenshire. Villages include Manordeilo, Halfway, Cwmifor and Capel Isaac.

Governance
An electoral ward in the same name exists. This ward stretches north to Talley with a total population, again taken at the 2011 census, of 2,248.

References

External links
Community council website

Communities in Carmarthenshire
Carmarthenshire electoral wards